The Florence Firehouse is located at 8415 North 29th Street in the Florence neighborhood in the north end of Omaha, Nebraska. Built in 1888, it housed Florence Hose Company #1.

History
The original Florence Fire Station was a "temporary" wood structure built in 1854 by the Florence city council. Located at the intersection of State and 4th Street, now called 29th Street, the Firehouse was simply a large garage that could accommodate two horses and the fire rig. 

The city built a new structure of brick in 1888, and the volunteer firemen were called Fire Hose Company #1. When the City of Omaha annexed Florence in 1917, they immediately abandoned the station. In 1998 it was purchased by the Florence Historical Society.

See also
 History of Omaha, Nebraska

References

External links
 Photo of the Florence Firehouse.
 Historic photo of Florence Hose #1.

Fire stations completed in 1854
Fire stations completed in 1888
Buildings and structures in Omaha, Nebraska
Landmarks in North Omaha, Nebraska
Defunct fire stations in Nebraska
1854 establishments in Nebraska Territory